Death Wish Coffee is a coffee brand based in the United States. Their coffee is primarily sold online, but can also be found in grocery stores across the United States.

Death Wish Coffee was introduced in 2012. The company was founded by Mike Brown in Saratoga Springs, New York, and is headquartered there. Its production facility is in Round Lake, New York. Death Wish claims that its coffee has double the caffeine of an average cup of coffee, but that it also does not taste bitter or acidic.

Death Wish Coffee and Valhalla Java are USDA-certified organic and can be found in many stores across the nation, including Hannaford, Kroger, Price Chopper, Healthy Living Market, ShopRite, Safeway, and Walmart.

Awards and recognition
Death Wish Coffee gained publicity when it was chosen as the winner of Intuit QuickBooks' "Small Business, Big Game" competition in 2015, allowing it to have a Super Bowl commercial carried nationwide free of charge during Super Bowl 50.

In 2017, owner and founder Mike Brown was named the EY Entrepreneur of the Year for Emerging Business in New York. Mike Brown was also named a 2018 40 Under 40 by the Albany Business Review.

Coffee to the International Space Station

On June 29, 2018, Death Wish Coffee sent an instant, freeze-dried version of its coffee to the International Space Station aboard the Falcon 9 SpaceX rocket with the Dragon capsule. The coffee arrived at the station on July 2, 2018.

The coffee company once again sent black coffee into three tubes with airtight clamps called MixStix into the space in June 2019 as a part of partnership with iLEAD and DreamUp – a provider of space-based educational opportunities. The purpose was to test whether black coffee kills a particular bacteria found in dental plaque in micro-gravity in the same way as it does on Earth.

Social responsibility
Death Wish Coffee partners with different non-profit and social organizations to sponsor events, social causes and more.

Special Olympics New York
Special Olympics New York is a non-profit sports organization for children and adults with intellectual and physical disabilities. Death Wish Coffee partnered with Special Olympics New York for three years. In 2018, Death Wish Coffee generated $37,492.50 for Special Olympics New York through special edition mug sale where 100% of the proceed directly went to the charity. The coffee chain also sponsors charity's annual summer event.

Recall
In September 2017, Death Wish Coffee voluntarily recalled its 11-ounce cans of Death Wish Nitro Cold Brew coffee. Concerns arose that their cold brewing process could allow the growth of Clostridium botulinum, the bacterium responsible for botulism. No illnesses were reported.

NASCAR

In June 2020, Death Wish Coffee was the primary sponsor of NASCAR Xfinity Series driver Anthony Alfredo in the eighth race of the season at Atlanta Motor Speedway. They would sponsor the #21 Richard Childress Racing Chevrolet for two more races, at Texas Motor Speedway in July and at Bristol Motor Speedway in September. Death Wish Coffee continued their relationship with Alfredo when the driver joined Front Row Motorsports driving a Ford Mustang in the #38 in the NASCAR Cup Series. They sponsored Alfredo in the fifteenth race of the season at Charlotte Motor Speedway in the Coca-Cola 600 in May. They would sponsor Alfredo again for both races at Pocono Raceway in June. In 2022 they would follow Alfredo back to the NASCAR Xfinity Series, this time driving for Our Motorsports in the #23 Chevrolet Camaro.

References

External links

Fair trade brands
Coffee brands
American companies established in 2012
Companies based in Saratoga County, New York
Coffee companies of the United States